Arddlîn (sometimes anglicised as Arddleen) is a village in Powys, central Wales. It lies about 5 miles north of Welshpool, in the community of Llandrinio. It had a population of 418 as of the 2011 census, with 31% born in Wales.

The village was formerly served by Arddleen railway station on the Cambrian Railway network.

References

Villages in Powys